The Crash of '47 is the first studio album released by the American alternative metal band Atomship. It was released on May 4, 2004 and was produced by Dave Fortman (Evanescence, Superjoint Ritual). The song "Time for People" was released on the Wind-Up soundtrack for the movie The Punisher. Two singles were released from The Crash of '47: "Pencil Fight" and "Withered".

Atomship
Atomship started out as Watership Down, containing Nathan Slade and Chad Kent, both of whom played on The Crash of '47, and Derek Pardoe, who only wrote songs for the album. After the name change to Atomship, Joey Culver subbed as the lead vocalist, while Pardoe had personal troubles while he dealt with anxiety problems and as a result was unable to participate. The bass was played by Slade on 5 tracks, and Cordell Crockett (bassist of Ugly Kid Joe) played on the rest.

Track listing

Songs written by Pardoe, Kent, Slade,

Personnel 
Cordell Crockett - bass  (tracks: 1, 3 to 5, 9, 10)
Nathan Slade - bass, guitar (tracks: 2, 6 to 8, 11)
Chad Kent - drums
Joey Culver - vocals

Greg Leisz - pedal steel guitar on track 5

External links 
 Atomship official website

References 

2004 debut albums
Watership Down (band) albums
Wind-up Records albums